Aql may refer to:
 'Aql, an Islamic term
 Aquila (constellation), constellation abbreviation, as standardized by the International Astronomical Union
 Algic languages, by ISO 639-5 language code
 Said Aql (1912–2014), Lebanese poet, writer, playwright and language reformer
 Aql (company), a telecommunications company based in Leeds, UK

AQL may refer to:
 Acceptable quality limit, the worst-case quality level, expressed as a percentage of defects in a population, that is still considered acceptable
 Association québécoise de linguistique, the Quebec Linguistic Society
 AQL (ArangoDB_Query_Language), a database query language

See also 
 Marvelous AQL, former name of the Japanese video game developer and anime producer Marvelous